The Revolutionary Communist Party of Ivory Coast (PCRCI) is a communist party in Ivory Coast. It has been led by Achy Ekissi since 1990. Its youth wing is the Communist Youth of Ivory Coast. The party newspaper is the Révolution Prolétarienne.

Internationally, it participates in the International Conference of Marxist-Leninist Parties and Organizations, an international network of Communist parties that uphold the line of Enver Hoxha and the Albanian Party of Labour. As such, it is staunchly anti-revisionist.

References 

 Leftist Parties of the World: Côte d'Ivoire
 Sur la Reprise de la Guerre Civile en Cote D'ivoire et les Tueries Perpétrées par l'Armée Française Abidjan Addresse du PCRCI aux Partis et Organisations Communistes, 8 novembre 2004, (Address by Secretary General of the PCRCI, A. EKISSI) (in French)
 Rapport de la Commission d’enquête internationale sur les allégations de violations des droits de l’homme en Côte d’Ivoire (May 2004) on fr.wikisource

External links 
 
 mltranslations.org maintains a web page of PCRCI statements from 1995–2007

Communism in Ivory Coast
Anti-revisionist organizations
Côte d'Ivoire
Hoxhaist parties
Political parties in Ivory Coast
Political parties with year of establishment missing
Socialist parties in Ivory Coast